Antoinette McKenna was a singer and harpist from Dublin, Ireland. She accompanied her husband Joe, who learned to play pipes from Leo Rowsome and other members of the famed Pipers Club.

She died 30 September 2012.

References

Irish folk singers
Musicians from Dublin (city)
Year of birth missing (living people)